Éric Koloko (born 1 November 1950 in Lille) is a French dancer and choreographer, who was formerly a gymnast who competed at the 1976 Summer Olympics. He is well known in northern France for his dance routines in tribute to Michael Jackson.

References

French choreographers
French male artistic gymnasts
Sportspeople from Lille
1950 births
Olympic gymnasts of France
Gymnasts at the 1976 Summer Olympics
Living people